Anything You Want is a 2010 Spanish family drama film directed and written by Achero Mañas. The cast features Juan Diego Botto, José Luis Gómez, Ana Risueño, Pedro Alonso, Najwa Nimri and Lucía Fernández.

Plot 
Alicia, the mother figure of the Velasco family, dies in the wake of a seizure, thereby leaving her widowed husband Leo (a homophobic and conservative lawyer) in charge of the 4 year-old Dafne. With support from Alex (a client), Pedro (a business associate) and Marta (a former girlfriend), Leo does his best to take care of his daughter. In order to please young Dafne, Leo gets to the point of cross-dressing as a mother.

Cast

Production 
The film was produced by Bellatrix Films and Todo lo que tú quieras AIE, with the participation of TVE. Shooting took place in Madrid and lasted for seven weeks. Shooting locations in Madrid included the Centro, Moncloa-Aravaca, and Ciudad Lineal districts. David Omedes took over cinematography duties.

Release 
Distributed by Wanda Vision, Anything You Want was theatrically released in Spain on 10 September 2010. The film was also added to the lineup of the 35th Toronto International Film Festival's Contemporary World Cinema section.

Reception 
Andrea G. Bermejo of Cinemanía scored 4 out of 5 stars, deeming Anything You Want to be "an extremely risky film" (starting by the cast of a 4-year-old girl in a non-supporting role), considering the parent-child relationship featured in the film to be a "luminous" counterpart to the one present in Pellet, likewise writing that working mothers would love the film.

Pere Vall of Fotogramas also gave the film 4 out of 5 stars, assessing the risk (taken) and Juan Diego Botto to be the best things about the film, considering that the story grows as it sidesteps writing tropes, building its "own indomitable personality".

Accolades 

|-
| align = "center" | 2011 || 66th CEC Medals || Best Supporting Actor || José Luis Gómez ||  || align = "center" | 
|}

See also 
 List of Spanish films of 2010

References 

Films about widowhood
Cross-dressing in film
2010s Spanish-language films
Spanish drama films
2010 drama films
2010 films
Films about parenting
2010s Spanish films